Tallison Diego Nunes Da Costa (born 26 March 1998), commonly known as Tallison, is a Brazilian professional footballer who plays as a goalkeeper for Super League 2 club Apollon Larissa.

References 

1998 births
Living people
Brazilian footballers
Association football goalkeepers
Vila Nova Futebol Clube players
Anápolis Futebol Clube players
Trindade Atlético Clube players
Centro Sportivo Alagoano players
Murici Futebol Clube players
Apollon Larissa F.C. players
Brazilian expatriate footballers
Brazilian expatriate sportspeople in Greece
Expatriate footballers in Greece